The Juno Award for Traditional Roots Album of the Year is presented annually at Canada's Juno Awards to honour the best album of the year in the traditional roots genre. Prior to 2016, awards for this genre were awarded in two categories: Roots & Traditional - Solo and Roots & Traditional - Group. The awards categories were modified, to Traditional Roots and Contemporary Roots, beginning with the 2016 ceremony to "ensure two genres of music are not competing against each other in the same category".

Winners and nominees

References

Traditional Roots
Album awards
Folk music awards